Julieta Jankunas  (born 20 January 1999) is an Argentine field hockey player and part of the Argentina national team. She plays with the Argentina national field hockey team, winning silver medal at the 2020 Summer Olympics.

Career 
She participated in the 2014 Summer Youth Olympics, and the 2016 Women's Hockey Junior World Cup. She won a gold medal at the 2019 Pan American Games. 

On club level she plays for Universitario de Córdoba in Argentina. In December 2019, she was nominated for the FIH Rising Star of the Year Award.

References

External links
fieldhockey.com
lancasteronline.com

epa.eu
Getty Images

1999 births
Living people
Las Leonas players
Argentine female field hockey players
Argentine people of Lithuanian descent
Field hockey players at the 2014 Summer Youth Olympics
Sportspeople from Córdoba, Argentina
South American Games gold medalists for Argentina
South American Games medalists in field hockey
Female field hockey forwards
Competitors at the 2018 South American Games
Pan American Games medalists in field hockey
Field hockey players at the 2019 Pan American Games
Pan American Games gold medalists for Argentina
Medalists at the 2019 Pan American Games
Field hockey players at the 2020 Summer Olympics
Olympic field hockey players of Argentina
Olympic silver medalists for Argentina
Medalists at the 2020 Summer Olympics
Olympic medalists in field hockey